François Partant (1926 – 25 June 1987) was a French economist. He was one of the first theoreticians of degrowth. He is known for one of his books, The End of Development, published in 1982.

References

1926 births
1987 deaths
Ecological economists
Degrowth advocates
20th-century French  economists